José Manuel Fernández (born February 13, 1993) is a Dominican Professional Baseball Pitcher who is currently a free agent. He previously played in Major League Baseball (MLB) for the Toronto Blue Jays and Detroit Tigers.

Professional career

Toronto Blue Jays

Fernández signed as an international free agent with the Toronto Blue Jays on January 5, 2012, and was assigned to the Dominican Summer League Blue Jays in July. In nine games, he posted a 2–0 win–loss record, 1.52 earned run average, and 34 strikeouts in  innings pitched. In 2013, Fernández made 16 relief appearances for the Rookie-level Gulf Coast League Blue Jays, and went 1–0 with a 2.70 ERA and 13 strikeouts. He played the entire 2014 season with the Short Season-A Vancouver Canadians, going 1–1 with a 4.01 ERA and 24 strikeouts in  innings. Fernández continued to rise through the Blue Jays minor league system, spending all of 2015 with the Class-A Lansing Lugnuts. In 35 games, he pitched to a 1–2 record, 3.31 ERA, and 41 strikeouts in  innings. Fernández struggled with his command in 2016 while with the Advanced-A Dunedin Blue Jays, walking 34 batters in  innings. He ended the year with a 1–1 record, 4.12 ERA, and 41 strikeouts. In the offseason, Fernández appeared in 13 games for the Estrellas de Oriente of the Dominican Winter League, and posted a 2.70 ERA and 13 strikeouts.

Fernández was assigned to the Double-A New Hampshire Fisher Cats for the 2017 season, and pitched to a 1–2 record, 5.44 ERA, and 48 strikeouts in  innings. He returned to the Estrellas de Oriente in the offseason, appearing in 12 games. Heading into the 2018 season, Fernández was invited to spring training by the Blue Jays. He was assigned to New Hampshire to begin the year, and was promoted to the Triple-A Buffalo Bisons in late June. In  combined innings, Fernández went 4–3 with a 2.97 ERA and 65 strikeouts.

Fernández was called up to the majors for the first time on September 1, 2018, as a September call-up. During the 2018 season, he allowed seven runs on 10 hits over  innings in 13 appearances while walking four and striking out six.

Detroit Tigers
Fernández was claimed off waivers by the Detroit Tigers on November 2, 2018. On July 3, 2019, he was designated for assignment by the Tigers. He became a minor league free agent on November 7, 2019.

Atlanta Braves
On February 24, 2020, Fernández signed a minor league contract with the Atlanta Braves. Fernández did not play in a game in 2020 due to the cancellation of the minor league season because of the COVID-19 pandemic. He was released by the Braves organization on May 28.

Hamilton Cardinals
On April 2, 2022, Fernández signed with the Hamilton Cardinals of the Intercounty Baseball League but has not made a single appearance with them as of July 1st 2022.

References

External links

1993 births
Buffalo Bisons (minor league) players
Detroit Tigers players
Dominican Republic expatriate baseball players in Canada
Dominican Republic expatriate baseball players in the United States
Dominican Summer League Blue Jays players
Dunedin Blue Jays players
Erie SeaWolves players
Estrellas Orientales players
Gulf Coast Blue Jays players
Lansing Lugnuts players
Living people
Major League Baseball pitchers
Major League Baseball players from the Dominican Republic
New Hampshire Fisher Cats players
Toledo Mud Hens players
Toronto Blue Jays players
Vancouver Canadians players